Lindsey Erin Pearlman (October 5, 1978 – February 18, 2022) was an American actress and voice actress known for her roles on General Hospital and Chicago Justice. She was also active in radio commercials.

Personal life
Pearlman was born on October 5, 1978, in Chicago, Illinois and started her acting career at a young age.
She was married to Vance Smith, a TV producer. She was a staunch animal rights activist who helped to abolish the use of wild animals in Ringling Brothers Circus. Pearlman devoted a great deal of time and effort to rescuing, fostering, and finding permanent homes for animals.

Career
Pearlman trained at The Second City Conservatory. She recurred in Chicago Justice, in the role of Joy Fletcher, for five episodes. She also had guest roles in Sneaky Pete, American Housewife, The Purge, General Hospital, and countless television commercials.

In 2021, she recurred as Martha on The Ms. Pat Show, and as Karen in Haus of Vicious. She also played Diane Warren on Selena: The Series on Netflix (2021).

Death
On February 13, 2022, Pearlman was reported missing to LAPD. Police found her body in a vehicle on February 18, after responding to a radio call for a death investigation at Franklin Avenue and North Sierra Bonita Avenue. The cause of death, confirmed by the Los Angeles County medical examiner, was determined to be suicide by intentional overdose of sodium nitrite.

Filmography

References

External links
 

1978 births
2022 deaths
21st-century American actresses
Actresses from Chicago
Drug-related suicides in California